The Financial Coalition Against Child Pornography (FCACP) is a coalition of credit card issuers and Internet services companies that seeks to eliminate commercial child pornography by taking action on the payment systems that are used to fund these illegal operations.

In 2006, the International Centre for Missing & Exploited Children (ICMEC), the National Center for Missing & Exploited Children (NCMEC), and a number of banks, credit card companies, and electronic and third party payment networks created the Financial Coalition Against Child Pornography. The Financial Coalition consists of 34 banks, payment companies, and internet services companies.

Senator Richard C. Shelby (R-AL), Chairman of the U.S. Senate Banking, Housing, and Urban Affairs Committee, was the catalyst in bringing these industry leaders together to address the problem. 

Members of the Coalition include America Online, American Express Company, Authorize.net, Bank of America, Capital One, Chase, Citigroup, Discover Financial Services LLC, First Data Corporation, First National Bank of Omaha, Google, HSBC - NA, JP Morgan Chase, MasterCard, Microsoft, North American Bancard, Nova Information Systems, PayPal, First PREMIER Bank/PREMIER Bankcard, Standard Chartered Bank, Visa, Washington Mutual, Wells Fargo, and Yahoo! Inc.

This U.S.-based effort expanded regionally with the creation of the Asia Pacific Financial Coalition in August 2009. The Coalition's initial objective was to make people and companies aware of the issue of online child sexual abuse, and how its sale and distribution was being conducted across payment and technology platforms. In 2013, the Asia Pacific FCACP/ICMEC published "Confronting New Challenges in the Fight Against Child Pornography: Best Practices to Help File Hosting and File Sharing Companies Fight the Distribution of Child Sexual Exploitation Content."

References

External links
U.S. Senator Richard Shelby (R-Ala.) press release: Shelby Leads Fight Against Child Pornography. March 15, 2006
USA Today, Updated 5/26/2006 1:22 AM ET:  Financial firms attack child porn
The Christian Science Monitor. from the March 16, 2006 edition. "A siege on the child-porn market. Titans of finance join forces to try to thwart online trafficking in illicit images." By Ron Scherer, staff writer of The Christian Science Monitor
 BBC News, Thursday, 16 March 2006, 12:22 GMT: "Net and finance firms are joining up to stamp out commercial child pornography"
InformationWeek, Mar 17, 2006 01:17 PM "As Child Porn Industry Grows, Coalition Launches Counterattack" By J. Nicholas Hoover, InformationWeek
 NACHA JOINS THE FINANCIAL COALITION AGAINST CHILD PORNOGRAPHY January 16, 2007
 ASACP Participates in Financial Coalition Against Child Pornography November 20, 2007
Preventing and Detecting Child Pornography Best Practices from the Financial Coalition Against Child Pornography August 24, 2007

Non-profit organizations based in the United States
Anti–child pornography organizations
Child welfare in the United States